Blake Brandel (born January 23, 1997) is an American football offensive tackle for the Minnesota Vikings of the National Football League (NFL). He played college football at Oregon State, and was drafted by the Vikings in the sixth round of the 2020 NFL Draft. He is married to Natalie Stone.

College career
A 3-star recruit, Brandel committed to Oregon State over offers from Colorado, Nevada, and Washington State. He made 48 consecutive starts for the Beavers between 2016 and 2019. He was a Second-team All-Pac-12 honoree in 2019. Brandel was also a three-time all-academic team selection.

Professional career
Brandel was selected by the Minnesota Vikings with the 203rd overall pick in the sixth round of the 2020 NFL Draft. He was placed on the reserve/COVID-19 list by the Vikings on July 27, 2020, and activated four days later. Brandel was waived by the Vikings during final roster cuts on September 5, 2020, and was signed to the practice squad the next day. He signed a reserve/future contract with the Vikings on January 4, 2021.

On September 25, 2021, Brandel was waived by the Vikings and re-signed to the practice squad. He was promoted to the active roster on October 18, 2021.

Brandel was named a backup tackle to start the 2022 season. He started three games at left tackle in place of an injured Christian Darrisaw. He was placed on injured reserve on December 14, 2022. He was activated on January 14, 2023.

References

External links
Oregon State Beavers bio

1997 births
Living people
Players of American football from Oregon
People from Pendleton, Oregon
American football offensive tackles
Oregon State Beavers football players
Minnesota Vikings players